Bernard More Troughton Shute Leete OBE AFC (8 October 1898 – 1978) was an English aviator in the 1930s. He was an aviation pioneer and was awarded Officer of the Order of the British Empire for his achievements.

England to India
In November 1926, Bernard Leete accompanied fellow aviation pioneer and air racer T.N. Stack made an attempt to reach Karachi (located in India at the time) in a De Havilland DH.60. They both reached their objective in June 1927 and he was awarded an AFC for his achievements.

Honours and awards
3 June 1927 Bernard More Troughton Shute Leete a Flying Officer in the Reserve of Air Force Officers is awarded the Air Force Cross "in recognition of the distinguished service rendered to aviation by his recent flight in a light aeroplane from London to Delhi"
1 January 1942 Bernard More Troughton Shute Leete a technical officer of the Civil Aviation Directorate of the Government of India is appointed an Officer of the Order of the British Empire.

References

1898 births
1978 deaths
British aviation pioneers
English aviators
Officers of the Order of the British Empire
People from Claygate
Recipients of the Air Force Cross (United Kingdom)
Royal Air Force officers